is a junction passenger railway station located in the city of  Ōtsu, Shiga Prefecture, Japan, operated by the private railway company Keihan Electric Railway.

Lines

Station layout
The station consists of two island platforms connected by an elevated station building.

Platforms

Adjacent stations

History
The private Ōtsu Electric Railway began operations to the station in 1913, the same year that the Tōkaidō Main Line was rerouted to bypass this station and JGR operations ceased. The station was renamed  on June 1, 1913. It was renamed again to its present name on March 17, 2018.

Past lines (Ōtsu Station)

Passenger statistics
In fiscal 2018, the station was used by an average of 3008 passengers daily (boarding passengers only).

Surrounding area
 Otsu Port
 Former Otsu Public Hall
Shiga Prefectural Road 558 Takashima Otsu Line
 Shiga Prefectural Road No. 18 Otsu Kusatsu Linehool

See also
List of railway stations in Japan

References

External links

official home page

Railway stations in Japan opened in 1880
Railway stations in Shiga Prefecture
Railway stations in Ōtsu
Stations of Keihan Electric Railway